Providence Mall  is a shopping mall in Pondicherry promoted by Prashanth Properties Private Limited.  Its total area is 2.5lakh square feet.  It contains shops, sale outlets, a food court and a cinema It was inaugurated on 12 November 2017 by V. Narayanasamy, the Chief Minister of Puducherry.

References

External links 
Providence Mall Photos & Address

Buildings and structures in Pondicherry (city)
Shopping malls in Puducherry (union territory)
2017 establishments in Puducherry
Shopping malls established in 2017